Rafah is a Palestinian city in the southern Gaza Strip. Rafah's population of 152,950 (2014) is overwhelmingly made up of former Palestinian refugees.

When Israel withdrew from the Sinai in 1982, Rafah was split into a Gazan part and an Egyptian part, dividing families, separated by barbed-wire barriers. The core of the city was destroyed by Israel and Egypt to create a large buffer zone.

Rafah is the site of the Rafah Border Crossing, the sole crossing point between Egypt and the State of Palestine. Gaza's only airport, Yasser Arafat International Airport, was located just south of the city. The airport operated from 1998 to 2001, until it was bombed and bulldozed by the Israeli military (IDF) after the killing of Israeli soldiers by members of Hamas.

Etymology

The transliteration of the Hebrew name, "Rafiah", is used in modern English alongside "Rafah"

Development

The Ottoman–British agreement of 1 October 1906 established a boundary between Ottoman ruled Palestine and British ruled Egypt, from Taba to Rafah. After World War I Palestine was also under British control, but the Egypt-Palestine Boundary was maintained to control movement of the local Bedouin. From the mid-1930s the British enhanced the border control and Rafah evolved as a small boundary town which functioned as a trade and services centre for the semi-settled Beduin population. During the Second World War it became an important British base.

Following the Armistice Agreement of 24 February 1949, Rafah was located in Egypt-occupied Gaza and consequently, a Gaza–Egypt border did no longer exist. Rafah could grow without any consideration being taken of the old 1906 international boundary. In the 1967 Six-Day War, Israel conquered the Sinai Peninsula and the Gaza Strip from Egypt and all of the city now was under Israeli occupation.

In 1979, Israel and Egypt signed a peace treaty that returned the Sinai, which borders the Gaza Strip, to Egyptian control. In the Peace Treaty, the re-created Gaza–Egypt border was drawn across the city of Rafah. Rafah was divided into an Egyptian and a Palestinian part, splitting up families, separated by barbed-wire barriers. Families were separated, property was divided and many houses and orchards were cut across and destroyed by the new boundary, bulldozed, allegedly for security reasons. Rafah became one of the three border points between Egypt and Israel.

Demographics
In 1922, Rafah's population was 599, which increased to 2,220 in 1945. In 1982, the total population was approximately 10,800.

In the 1997 Palestinian Central Bureau of Statistics (PCBS) census, Rafah and its adjacent camp had a combined population of 91,181, Tall as-Sultan was listed with a further 17,141. Refugees made up 80.3% of the entire population. In the 1997 census, Rafah's (together with Rafah camp) gender distribution was 50.5% male and 49.5% female.

In the 2006 PCBS estimate, Rafah city had a population of 71,003, Rafah camp and Tall as-Sultan form separate localities for census purposes, having populations of 59,983 and 24,418, respectively.

Archaeology
Antiochus III willing to make peace with Ptolemy V, had his daughter Cleopatra I marry Ptolemy V. Their marriage took place in 193 BC in Raphia

History

Bronze Age Raphia
Rafah has a history stretching back thousands of years. It was first recorded in an inscription of Egyptian Pharaoh Seti I, from 1303 BCE as Rph, and as the first stop on Pharaoh Shoshenq I's campaign to the Levant in 925 BCE. In 720 BCE it was the site of the Assyrian king Sargon II's victory over the Egyptians.

Hellenistic and Roman periods
In 217 BCE the Battle of Raphia was fought between the victorious Ptolemy IV and Antiochus III. It is said to be one of the largest battles ever fought in the Levant, with over a hundred thousand soldiers and hundreds of elephants.

The town was conquered by Alexander Yannai and held by the Hasmoneans until it was rebuilt in the time of Pompey and Gabinius; the latter seems to have done the actual work of restoration for the era of the town dates from 57 BCE. Rafah is mentioned in Strabo (16, 2, 31), the Antonine Itinerary, and is depicted on the Map of Madaba.

Byzantine period
During the Byzantine period, it was a diocese, and Byzantine ceramics and coins have been found there. It was represented at the Council of Ephesus 431 CE by Bishop Romanus, but today remains a titular see of the Roman Catholic Church but a small Greek Orthodox presence exists.

Early Muslim to Mamluk periods
Rafah was one of the towns captured by the Rashidun army under general 'Amr ibn al-'As in 635 CE, and subsequently was an important trading city during the Early Muslim period. Under the Umayyads and Abbasids, Rafah was the southernmost border of Jund Filastin ("District of Palestine"). According to Arab geographer al-Ya'qubi, it was the last town in the Province of Syria and on the road from Ramla to Egypt.

A Jewish community settled in the city in the 9th and 10th centuries and again in the 12th, although in the 11th century it suffered a decline and in 1080 they migrated to Ashkelon. A Samaritan community also lived there during this period. Like most cities of southern Palestine, ancient Rafah had a landing place on the coast (now Tell Rafah), while the main city was inland.

In 1226, Arab geographer Yaqut al-Hamawi writes of Rafah's former importance in the early Arab period, saying it was "of old a flourishing town, with a market, and a mosque, and hostelries". However, he goes on to say that in its current state, Rafah was in ruins, but was an Ayyubid postal station on the road to Egypt after nearby Deir al-Balah.

Ottoman and Egyptian period
Rafah appeared in the 1596 Ottoman tax registers as being in the Nahiya of Gaza of the Liwa of Gazza. It had a population of 15 households, all Muslim, who paid taxes on wheat, barley, summer crops, occasional revenues, goats and/or bee hives.

In 1799, the Revolutionary Army of France commanded by Napoleon Bonaparte passed through Rafah during the invasion of Egypt and Syria.

Rafah was the boundary between the provinces of Egypt and Syria. In 1832, the area came under Egyptian occupation of Muhammad Ali, which lasted until 1840.

The French explorer Victor Guérin, who visited in May 1863, noted two pillars of granite which the locals called Bab el Medinet, meaning "The Gate of the town". In 1881, Archduke Ludwig Salvator of Austria wrote: "Fragments of gray granite pillars, still standing, are here to be met with about the road, the fields, and the sand, and we saw one lying on the ground half buried... The pillars are the remains of an ancient temple, Raphia, and are of special importance in the eyes of the Arabs, who call them Rafah, as they mark the boundary between Egypt and Syria."

WWI and British Mandate
In 1917, the British army captured Rafah, and used it as a base for their attack on Gaza. The presence of the army bases was an economic draw that brought people back to the city.

In the 1922 census of Palestine conducted by the British Mandate authorities, Rafah had a population of 599 inhabitants, all Muslim, increasing in the 1931 census to 1,423, still all Muslims, in 228 houses.

In the 1945 statistics Rafah had a population of 2,220, all Muslims, with 40,579 dunams of land, according to an official land and population survey. Of this, 275 dunams were plantations and irrigable land, 24,173 used for cereals, while 16,131 dunams were un-cultivable land.

1948–1967

After the 1948 Arab–Israeli War, Egypt governed the area (see Palestinian Protectorate) and refugee camps were established. In the 1956 war involving Israel, Britain, France, and Egypt, 111 people, including 103 refugees, were killed by the Israeli army in the Palestinian refugee camp of Rafah, during the Rafah massacre. The United Nations was unable to determine the circumstances surrounding the deaths.

During the 1967 Six-Day War, the Israel Defense Forces captured Rafah with the Sinai Peninsula and Gaza Strip, the population was about 55,000, of whom only 11,000 lived in Rafah itself.

On Friday, 9 June 1967, the Israeli army bulldozed & blew up 144 houses in Rafah refugee camp killing 23 inhabitants.

After 1967
In the summer of 1971, the IDF, under General Ariel Sharon (then head of the IDF southern command), destroyed approximately 500 houses in the refugee camps of Rafah in order to create patrol roads for Israeli forces. These demolitions displaced nearly 4,000 people. Israel established the Brazil and Canada housing projects to accommodate displaced Palestinians and to provide better conditions in the hopes of integrating the refugees into the general population and its standard of living; Brazil is immediate south of Rafah, while Canada was just across the border in Sinai. Both were named because UN peacekeeping troops from those respective countries had maintained barracks in those locations. After the 1978 Camp David Accords mandated the repatriation of Canada project refugees to the Gaza Strip, the Tel al-Sultan project, northwest of Rafah, was built to accommodate them.

During the early months of First Intifada on 25 April 1989 Rafah resident Khaled Musa Armilat, aged 22, was shot dead by Israeli soldiers in Khan Yunis. In a letter to a Member of Knesset, March 1990, Defence Minister Yitzhak Rabin stated that the dead man's brother had been interrogated and stated that he had been killed by Border Police but four months later he blamed the army. Rabin added the matter was being investigated by the Israeli Police.
Three and a half weeks after Armilat's killing, 19 May, five civilians including a 50-year-old woman and a 13-year-old boy, were killed in Rafah by Israeli soldiers using plastic bullets. Two of the 12 other casualties later died of their wounds.

In May 2004, the Israeli Government led by, then Prime Minister, Ariel Sharon approved another mass demolition of homes in Rafah. Therefore, he obtained the nickname "the bulldozer".

In September 2005, Israel withdrew from the Gaza strip but Rafah remained divided, with part of it on the Egyptian side of the border under Egyptian rule. It has been claimed that it was in order to cope with the division of the town, that smugglers have made tunnels under the border, connecting the two parts and permitting the smuggling of goods and persons.

Rafah Border Crossing

Rafah is the site of the Rafah Border Crossing, the sole crossing between the Gaza Strip and Egypt. Formerly operated by Israeli military forces, control of the crossing was transferred to the Palestinian Authority in September 2005 as part of the larger Israeli withdrawal from the Gaza Strip. A European Union commission began monitoring the crossing in November 2005 amid Israeli security concerns, and in April 2006, Palestinian Authority chairman Mahmoud Abbas's Presidential Guard assumed responsibility for the site on the Palestinian Authority side.    On the Egyptian side, the responsibility is assumed by the 750 Border Guards allowed by an agreement of Egypt with Israel. The agreement was signed in November 2005 forced by US pressure, and specifies that it is under security requirements demanded by Israel.

Climate
Köppen-Geiger climate classification system classifies its climate as hot semi-arid (BSh).

See also

Rafah, Egypt
Gaza–Egypt border
European Union Border Assistance Mission Rafah
Israel–Gaza barrier
Philadelphi Corridor
Rafah Elementary Co-Ed "B" School
Rafah Governorate
Asma al-Ghul

References

Bibliography

External links
 United Nations Relief and Works Agency for Palestine Refugees in the Near East
Welcome To The City of Rafah
 Rafah Today, pictures by Palestinian journalist Mohammed Omer
 Rafah Smuggling Tunnels
 Rafah Pundits: Rafah Focused Blog
 Raising Yousuf – Blog by Laila el-Hadad who is a reporter for Aljazeera living in Gaza
 Reports from Rafah
 Interview with Hip Hop Artist Michael Franti – Reporting from Rafah.
 Part A Part B Satellite photos comparing 2001 to 2004.
 Razing Rafah: Mass Home Demolitions in the Gaza Strip – Human Rights Watch
 The Olympia-Rafah Sister City Project – The organization started by people in the communities of Rafah, Gaza, and Olympia, WA
 The Madison-Rafah Sister City Project – A sistering project connecting the communities of Rafah, Gaza, and Madison, WI

Cities in the Gaza Strip
History of Palestine (region)
Divided cities
Rafah Governorate
Municipalities of the State of Palestine